Mycobacterium mucogenicum
Etymology: mucogenicum, from the organism's highly mucoid appearance.

Description
Gram-positive, nonmotile, curved and acid-fast rods.

Colony characteristics
Highly mucoid behavior of most strains on solid agar. Smooth and off-white on Middlebrook 7H10 agar

Physiology
Rapid growth on Middlebrook 7H10 at 28 °C to 37 °C, but not at 42 °C, within 2 – 4 days.
Susceptible to amikacin, imipenem, cefoxitin, clarithromycin and ciprofloxacin.
Resistant to isoniazid and rifampin.

Pathogenesis
Posttraumatic skin infections,
catheter sepsis and respiratory isolates without clinical significance except in immunocompromised hosts.
Biosafety level 2

Type strain
First isolated in 1976 during an outbreak of peritonitis associated with automated peritoneal dialysis machines in the north-western United States. In 2019, a complete genome sequence of M. mucogenicum DSM 44124 (isolated from the cause of peritonitis) was sequenced by using the PacBio Sequencing Technology and with the median coverage 101x resulted in to a final genome assembly of size 6,099,273 base pairs is available at the NCBI database with an accession id POTL00000000.
Strain ATCC 49650 = CCUG 47451 = CIP 105223 = DSM 44625 = JCM 13575.

References

Springer et al. 1995.  Phylogeny of the Mycobacterium chelonae-like organism based on partial sequencing of the 16S rRNA gene and proposal of Mycobacterium mucogenicum sp. nov. Int. J. Syst. Bacteriol., 45, 262–267.

External links
Type strain of Mycobacterium mucogenicum at BacDive -  the Bacterial Diversity Metadatabase

Acid-fast bacilli
mucogenicum
Bacteria described in 1995